The 55th Cinema Audio Society Awards was held on February 16, 2019, virtually, honoring outstanding achievement in sound mixing in film and television of 2018.

Winners and nominees

References

2018 film awards
2018 television awards
Cinema Audio Society Awards
2018 in American cinema
2018 guild awards